Scrobicaria is a genus of South American plants in the groundsel tribe within the daisy family.

 Species
 Scrobicaria aquifolia (Cuatrec.) B.Nord. - Venezuela
 Scrobicaria ilicifolia (L.f.) B.Nord. - Colombia
 Scrobicaria soatana S.Díaz & A.Correa - Colombia

References

Senecioneae
Flora of South America
Asteraceae genera